Tatyana Dshandshgava, née Shalimova (born February 25, 1964) is a Kazakhstani and Russian former handball player who competed for the Soviet Union in the 1988 Summer Olympics, for the Unified Team in the 1992 Summer Olympics, and for Austria in the 2000 Summer Olympics.

She was born in Atbasar.

In 1988 she won the bronze medal with the Soviet team. She played all five matches as goalkeeper.

Four years later she was a member of the Unified Team which won the bronze medal. She played all five matches as goalkeeper.

At the 2000 Games she finished fifth with the Austrian team in the Olympic tournament. She played five matches and scored one goal as goalkeeper.

External links
profile

1964 births
Living people
People from Akmola Region
Soviet female handball players
Kazakhstani female handball players
Russian female handball players
Austrian female handball players
Olympic handball players of the Soviet Union
Olympic handball players of the Unified Team
Olympic handball players of Austria
Handball players at the 1988 Summer Olympics
Handball players at the 1992 Summer Olympics
Handball players at the 2000 Summer Olympics
Olympic bronze medalists for the Soviet Union
Olympic bronze medalists for the Unified Team
Olympic medalists in handball  
Russian emigrants to Austria

Medalists at the 1992 Summer Olympics
Medalists at the 1988 Summer Olympics